Roberto Matosas Postiglione (born 11 May 1940 in Mercedes, Department of Soriano, Uruguay) is a Uruguayan former football defender.

Career
At the club level, he played for C.A. River Plate of Argentina and C.A. Peñarol of Uruguay. In September 1964, Club Atlético River Plate signed Matosas for a then-record transfer fee. He would play 165 league matches for the club from 1964 to 1968, with 12 goals. He finished his playing career in Mexico, playing for newly promoted San Luis and Toluca.

Matosas also was part of the Uruguay national football team. He participated in the 1970 FIFA World Cup in Mexico, where the Uruguayan side finished in fourth place.

After he retired from playing, Matosas became a football coach. He has managed Mexican side Veracruz.

References

External links

1940 births
Living people
People from Mercedes, Uruguay
Uruguayan footballers
Uruguay international footballers
1970 FIFA World Cup players
Uruguayan Primera División players
Liga MX players
Club Atlético River Plate footballers
Peñarol players
San Luis F.C. players
Deportivo Toluca F.C. players
Expatriate footballers in Argentina
Expatriate footballers in Mexico
Uruguayan expatriate footballers
Santos Laguna managers
C.F. Monterrey managers
C.D. Veracruz managers
Deportivo Toluca F.C. managers
Association football defenders
Uruguayan football managers